Rhincalanus gigas is a large Antarctic copepod.

Description

Distribution
R. gigas is found off of Antarctica, in addition to records off of South America, the Indian Ocean, and surrounding waters.

References

Calanoida